Josif Kazanxhi-Xuxi (13 June 1943 – 9 November 2012) was an Albanian footballer who played for Partizani Tirana, 17 Nëntori Tirana and the Albania national team in a career that lasted ten years between 1962 and 1972.

International career
He made his debut for Albania in an April 1977 European Championship qualification match away against West Germany and earned a total of 3 caps, scoring no goals. His final international was the home leg of the same Euro qualifying tournament against West Germany.

Honours
Albanian Superliga: 3
 1966, 1968, 1970

References

External links

1943 births
2012 deaths
Footballers from Tirana
Albanian footballers
Association football midfielders
Albania international footballers
KF Tirana players
FK Partizani Tirana players
Kategoria Superiore players